Pakistan–Uzbekistan relations are the foreign relations between Pakistan and Uzbekistan.

Country Comparison

History of Relations
Relations between the two states were established when the republic of Uzbekistan became independent following the collapse of the USSR in 1991. Pakistan was one of the first countries to recognize the independence of Uzbekistan, though relations between the two countries were initially strained by the situation in Afghanistan which both countries border as they supported opposing Afghan factions. However, relations have improved after the fall of the Taliban, and the death of Uzbek president Islam Karimov, and subsequent deepening of Uzbek outreach to regional countries under his successor Shavkat Mirziyoyev. Both countries have a cordial and deepening relationship as the two countries interests in Afghanistan have become aligned - with Uzbekistan formally hosting a Taliban delegation in 2019. Pakistan further wishes to gain access to Central Asian markets, while landlocked Uzbekistan to access ports on the Arabian Sea.

Economic Relationship 
Pakistan and Uzbekistan are members of different international forums including the United Nations, Organization of Islamic Cooperation (OIC), Economic Cooperation Organization (ECO) and Shanghai Cooperation Organization (SCO). Pakistan-Uzbekistan Joint Ministerial Commission (JMC) held on regular basis. 

Trade between both countries is increasing, rising threefold between 2018 and 2019, though bilateral trade in 2018 was low at $90 million on account of difficulties in transit across war torn Afghanistan. The first direct flights between the countries began in 2018 between Tashkent and Lahore launched by Uzbekistan Airways, and is expected to further increase trade between the two countries

Uzbeks in Pakistan
The Uzbek population in Pakistan numbers roughly 70,000, and consists of a small number of Uzbek immigrants from Uzbekistan, and a much larger number of Uzbek refugees from northern Afghanistan (around 2.3% of Afghans in Pakistan are Uzbeks). 4000 words common in both languages are found in Pakistan and Uzbekistan National Languages.

See also 
 Uzbeks in Pakistan
 Foreign relations of Pakistan
 Pakistani diaspora
 History of Pakistan
 History of Uzbekistan

References 

 
Uzbekistan
Bilateral relations of Uzbekistan